is a Japanese actress and voice actress who is currently affiliated with Intention.

Career
Asai became a member of the Seinenza Film Company on January 1, 2013. She graduated from the General Institute of Amusement Media. She voiced Okada in No Matter How I Look at It, It's You Guys' Fault I'm Not Popular!. In 2015, she voiced the title character Mio Naruse in the anime adaptation of The Testament of Sister New Devil. On October 1, 2017, she became a member of Toei Company's Toei Movie Studios.

Filmography

Anime

Live-action and other dubs

Video games

References

External links

1992 births
Living people
Japanese video game actresses
Japanese voice actresses
Voice actresses from Shizuoka Prefecture
21st-century Japanese actresses